Francesco Beschi is the current bishop of Bergamo.

Life 
Francesco Beschi was born to a railroad worker and his wife on 6 August 1951 in Brescia. He grew up in Brescia and joined the seminary of his diocese in his youth.
He became a priest in 1975 and for 12 years he was a parish priest in two parishes of Brescia. From 1987 he held various positions in the diocesan curia of the Diocese of Brescia. On 18 May  2003 he was consecrated as titular bishop of Vinda and assumed the duty as auxiliary bishop of Brescia.
On 22 January 2009 he was appointed by Pope Benedict XVI as bishop of Bergamo and on 15 March the same year he began his ministry as bishop of Bergamo. In 2011 he led the funeral of murdered teenager Yara Gambirasio.

References

External links and additional sources
 (for Chronology of Bishops) 
 (for Chronology of Bishops) 

1951 births
Living people
Religious leaders from Brescia
Bishops of Bergamo
21st-century Italian Roman Catholic bishops